Edgerley is a historic home and residential complex located at Oakland in Livingston County, New York. The -story original house was built in 1828 and is a rare example of Tidewater architecture in upstate New York with Roman Classic massing and Greek Revival detailing. Attached to it are a stucco addition from the 1870s and a stucco addition with garage from the 1930s. Also on the property is a guest cottage known as "Box Hill", a barn constructed about 1830, and several smaller outbuildings.

It was listed on the National Register of Historic Places in 1980.

References

Houses on the National Register of Historic Places in New York (state)
Houses completed in 1828
Houses in Livingston County, New York
National Register of Historic Places in Livingston County, New York